Totoral Department is a department of Córdoba Province in Argentina.

The provincial subdivision has a population of about 16,479 inhabitants in an area of 3,145 km2, and its capital city is Villa del Totoral.

Settlements
Candelaria Sud
Cañada de Luque
Capilla de Sitón
La Pampa
Las Peñas
Los Mistoles
Sarmiento
Simbolar
Sinsacate
Villa del Totoral

Departments of Córdoba Province, Argentina